Brighten the Corners is the fourth studio album by American indie rock band Pavement, released on February 11, 1997 by Matador Records. The album received very positive reviews from critics.

Recording
Brighten the Corners was recorded at a studio in Mitch Easter's house in North Carolina. According to singer and guitarist Stephen Malkmus, it was either Matador Records or Mary Timony from Helium who suggested that the band should record the album there. Although Brighten the Corners was mostly produced by Pavement and Bryce Goggin, Easter worked with the band for roughly a week when Goggin left the studio. 

The recording sessions involved a lot of editing, and the band would often record several versions of the same song before deciding on a final take. The vocals were then recorded in New York separately.

The album title was in reference to "Brighten The Corner Where You Are", a gospel hymn written by Homer Rodeheaver in the early 1900s.

Release 
Brighten the Corners was released on February 11, 1997 by Matador Records. In 2008, Matador released Brighten the Corners: Nicene Creedence Edition, a compilation containing Brighten the Corners in its entirety, as well as B-sides and other rarities from the same era.

Reception

Brighten the Corners received very positive reviews from critics and was ranked No. 10 in The Village Voices 1997 Pazz & Jop critics' poll. In the poll's accompanying essay, Robert Christgau referred to the album as one of his "favorite albums of the year, easy", alongside those by Yo La Tengo, Sleater-Kinney, and Arto Lindsay.

Track listing

Personnel

Pavement 
 Stephen Malkmus – lead vocals, guitar
 Bob Nastanovich – percussion, backing vocals
 Scott Kannberg – lead vocals (tracks 4, 10), backing vocals, guitar
 Steve West – drums, percussion
 Mark Ibold – bass guitar

Technical 
 Mitch Easter – engineer, mixing
 Bryce Goggin – engineer, mixing

Charts

Weekly charts

Singles

References

External links

1997 albums
Albums produced by Bryce Goggin
Albums produced by Mitch Easter
Domino Recording Company albums
Flying Nun Records albums
Matador Records albums
Pavement (band) albums